Pedrya Seymour (born 29 May 1995) is an Olympic Bahamian athlete competing in the hurdling events. She competed at the 2016 Summer Olympics, and 2020 Summer Olympics, in 100 m hurdles.

Career 
She studied at University of Texas, Austin, and University of Illinois, Champaign.

She represented her country at the 2016 World Indoor Championships without qualifying for the final. She placed 6th in the 2016 Summer Olympics finals in the 100 meters hurdles, and was the first Bahamian hurdler to make it to the finals. She competed at the 2019 Pan American Games.

Competition record

References

External links

1995 births
Living people
Bahamian female hurdlers
Olympic athletes of the Bahamas
Athletes (track and field) at the 2016 Summer Olympics
Texas Longhorns women's track and field athletes
Illinois Fighting Illini women's track and field athletes
Athletes (track and field) at the 2019 Pan American Games
Pan American Games competitors for the Bahamas
Athletes (track and field) at the 2020 Summer Olympics
Sportspeople from Nassau, Bahamas